Jabra is a Danish brand specializing in audio equipment, and more recently videoconference systems. It is owned by GN Audio, which is part of the Danish company, GN Group. Jabra engineers, manufactures, and markets wireless, true wireless, and corded headphones for consumers and business customers. Jabra Corporation was acquired by GN Audio in 2000.

History
In September 2000, US-American Jabra Corporation, founded in 1983 and holding some patents, was acquired by GN Audio, a division of the Danish company GN Group, the latter having been founded by C. F. Tietgen in 1869 as the Great Northern Telegraph Company. The manufacturing plant of the Jabra-products is located in China.

In 2006, GN consolidated its Contact Center and Office headset division under the Jabra brand. This was followed by a restructuring in 2008, which established two divisions within Jabra, which would later be called Enterprise and Consumer. This restructuring facilitated a greater focus on business-to-business and consumer markets respectively. Since 2012 the development is located in China, too.

In the beginning of 2019, GN Audio acquired Altia Systems to add video conferencing products to their line-up, at a reported cost of $125M. Later in the year, the first video product from the acquisition was announced, the Jabra PanaCast.

Jabra and GN Group 
Their products include wireless earbuds, noise-cancelling headphones, headsets (some with AI), video conferencing cameras and fitness-tracking sports headphones, designed for athletes to wear while exercising.

GN Group history 
The GN Group was founded 150 years ago, as the Great Northern Telegraph Company. GN Group has also been responsible for several developments, including laying the first intercontinental telegraph connections in the 19th century, developing 2.4 GHz technology in hearing aids for direct connectivity and producing the world's first made-for-iPhone hearing aid with direct stereo sound streaming.

References

Audio equipment manufacturers of Denmark
Manufacturing companies based in Copenhagen
Headphones manufacturers
Danish companies established in 1983
Danish brands
Companies based in Ballerup Municipality